Covered: Winter is the twelfth studio album by the American R&B group Boyz II Men. It was released through the band's own label MSM Music Group and Rhythm Zone on December 22, 2010 in Japan only. The album compromises nine English language cover versions of Japanese songs by Hikaru Utada, Toshinobu Kubota, Mika Nakashima, and others. Covered: Winter peaked at number 88 on the Japanese Albums Chart.

Track listing

Charts

Release history

References

Boyz II Men albums
2010 albums